Arambagh Government Polytechnic , is a government polytechnic located in Arambagh,  Hooghly district, West Bengal. This polytechnic is affiliated to the West Bengal State Council of Technical Education,  and recognized by AICTE, New Delhi. This polytechnic offers diploma courses in Electrical, Mechanical, and Civil Engineering.

References

External links

Universities and colleges in Hooghly district
Technical universities and colleges in West Bengal
2016 establishments in West Bengal
Educational institutions established in 2016